Parasophroniella is a genus of longhorn beetles of the subfamily Lamiinae, containing the following species:

 Parasophroniella birmanica Breuning, 1943
 Parasophroniella javanica Breuning, 1957
 Parasophroniella nigriscapus Breuning, 1975
 Parasophroniella tonkinensis Breuning, 1956

References

Desmiphorini